is a railway station in the city of Matsumoto, Nagano, Japan, operated by the private railway operating company Alpico Kōtsū.

Lines
Hata Station is a station on the Kamikōchi Line and is 11.1 kilometers from the terminus of the line at Matsumoto Station.

Station layout
The station has one ground-level island platform serving two tracks, connected to the station building by a level crossing.

Platforms

Adjacent stations

History
The kanji of its name was changed to the present form on 1 May 1956.

Passenger statistics
In fiscal 2016, the station was used by an average of 562 passengers daily (boarding passengers only).

Surrounding area
former Hata town hall
Hata Elementary School
Hata Middle School

See also
 List of railway stations in Japan

References

External links

 

Railway stations in Japan opened in 1922
Railway stations in Matsumoto City
Kamikōchi Line